Curtis Paul King (born 1946) is an American businessman and politician of the Republican Party. He is a member of the Washington State Senate. He has represented District 14 since 2007.

He holds B.S. degrees in Physics and Mathematics from the University of Washington. While working for General Electric, he received his M.B.A. from Clemson-Furman Universities.

Awards 
 2014 Guardians of Small Business award. Presented by NFIB.
 2021 Legislator of the Year award. Presented by Washington Farm Bureau.

References

Living people
Politicians from Yakima, Washington
University of Washington College of Arts and Sciences alumni
Republican Party Washington (state) state senators
21st-century American politicians
Clemson University alumni
1946 births